Vlastimil Hrubý (born 21 February 1985) is a Czech professional football player currently playing for Zbrojovka Brno as a goalkeeper.

External links
 
 

1985 births
Living people
Czech footballers
Association football goalkeepers
Czech First League players
FK Jablonec players
1. SC Znojmo players
People from Znojmo
Czech Republic youth international footballers
Sportspeople from the South Moravian Region
FC Zbrojovka Brno players
Czech National Football League players